Park Ka-Yeon (also Pak Ka-Yeon, ; born 28 January 1986) is a South Korean judoka, who played for the middleweight category. She won two silver medals for her division at the 2007 Summer Universiade in Bangkok, Thailand, and at the 2008 Asian Judo Championships in Jeju City.

Park represented South Korea at the 2008 Summer Olympics in Beijing, where she competed for the women's 70 kg class. She lost the first preliminary round match, by an ippon and a kami-shiho-gatame (circling bridge or rollover), to Japan's Masae Ueno. Because her opponent advanced further into the final match, Park offered another shot for the bronze medal by entering the repechage rounds. Unfortunately, she was defeated in her first match by China's Wang Juan, who successfully scored a yuko and a kosoto gake (small outer hook), at the end of the five-minute period.

References

External links
 
 
 

 NBC 2008 Olympics profile

Living people
Olympic judoka of South Korea
Judoka at the 2008 Summer Olympics
1986 births
South Korean female judoka
Universiade medalists in judo
Universiade silver medalists for South Korea
21st-century South Korean women